The 1991 Singapore Open (also known as the Konica Cup) was a four-star badminton tournament that took place at the Singapore Indoor Stadium in Singapore, from July 17 to July 21, 1991.  The total prize money on offer was US$90,000.

Venue
Singapore Indoor Stadium

Final results

References

Singapore Open (badminton)
Singapore
1991 in Singaporean sport